Johan Eriksson (born May 28, 1993) is a Swedish ice hockey player who currently plays for Elite Ice Hockey League (EIHL) side Dundee Stars. Eriksson last iced with fellow Elite League side Guildford Flames. He made his Elitserien debut playing with Brynäs IF during the 2012–13 Elitserien season.

References

External links

1993 births
Living people
Swedish ice hockey forwards
Almtuna IS players
Brynäs IF players
Dundee Stars players
Guildford Flames players
Modo Hockey players
Tierps HK players
Tingsryds AIF players
Swedish expatriate sportspeople in Austria
Swedish expatriate sportspeople in Scotland
Swedish expatriate sportspeople in France
Swedish expatriate sportspeople in England
Swedish expatriate ice hockey people
Expatriate ice hockey players in Scotland
Expatriate ice hockey players in England
Expatriate ice hockey players in Austria
Expatriate ice hockey players in France